The cantata  (Renunciation), WAB 14, is a cantata composed by Anton Bruckner in .

History 
Bruckner composed the cantata for the name-day of Michael Arneth, the prior of the St. Florian Abbey. The piece was intended to be performed on Arneth's name-day. It is not known when it was performed.

Why Bruckner has chosen this unsound text for the name-day of his Maecenas remains unexplained. Perhaps he has put so into music his resignation following his father's death or Aloisia Bogner's refusal of his proposal of marriage.

The manuscript is stored in the archive of the St. Florian Abbey. A facsimile of the cantata was first issued in band II/2, pp. 47–58 of the Göllerich/Auer biography. The cantata was thereafter issued by Ludwig Daxsperger in 1956.

Text 
The work is based on the poem Amaranth by Oskar von Redwitz.
{|
|
|style="padding-left:2em;"|O Mary! 
Noble and clement virgin!
Thou didst raise me, the motherless,
To the glory of thy Son,
Thou most faithful Mother!
Teach me also to bear now
The will of my Lord,
Obedient in renunciation,
Thou, star of obedience!
Mirror of humility, Mary!

O Mary! 
Thou source of holy love!
Take my love from me
And give it so faithfully to her
who already gave him the ring!
Nothing else grant me
Than that he be happy.
Just leave me this tear
And comfort me,
Mother of love, Mary!

O Mary! 
Strong shield of Heaven!
O protect him for ever,
On the noisy battlefield,
In secret danger!
I do not want to desire him,
However I bless him for ever.
With thy armies of angels
O surround his head,
Powerful Lady, Mary!
|}

Setting 
The 126-bar long work in B major is scored for  choir or quartet, soprano or tenor soloist, and organ (or piano).

The cantata is a ‘spiritual song’ in three sections, in ABA′ form:
 Choir: O Maria! Du Jungfrau mild und hehr!, 
 Aria: O Maria! Du Quell der heil'gen Lieb'!,  - soprano or tenor soloist
 Choir: O Maria! Du starker Himmelsschild!, 

The outer sections are in the form of Protestant chorale, with in bars 16–19 (Die treu'ste Mutter groß!) and 110–113 (In heimlicher Gefahr!) a direct quotation from "O Haupt voll Blut und Wunden".The expressive middle section, a solo for soprano or tenor in F major, is with large intervals and strong modulation. The contrapuntal accompaniment by the organ (or piano) has some reminiscences of the baroque opera.

References

Sources 
 August Göllerich, Anton Bruckner. Ein Lebens- und Schaffens-Bild,  – posthumous edited by Max Auer by G. Bosse, Regensburg, 1932
 Uwe Harten, Anton Bruckner. Ein Handbuch. , Salzburg, 1996. 
 Anton Bruckner – Sämtliche Werke, Band XXII/1: Kantaten und Chorwerke I (1845–1855), Musikwissenschaftlicher Verlag der Internationalen Bruckner-Gesellschaft, Franz Burkhart, Rudolf H. Führer and Leopold Nowak (Editor), Vienna, 1987 (Available on IMSLP: Neue Gesamtausgabe, XXII/1. Kantaten und Chorwerke Teil 1: Nr. 1-5)
 Cornelis van Zwol, Anton Bruckner 1824–1896 – Leven en werken, uitg. Thoth, Bussum, Netherlands, 2012. 
 Crawford Howie, Anton Bruckner - A documentary biography, online revised edition

External links 
 
  
 Entsagen B-Dur, WAB 14 Critical discography by Hans Roelofs 
 A life recording by the Coro "De Musica Antiqua" de Salamanca with Maria Espada (soprano) can be heard on Youtube: Bruckner - Entsagen

Cantatas by Anton Bruckner
1851 compositions
Compositions in B-flat major